SEI Investments Company, formerly Simulated Environments Inc, is a financial services company headquartered in Oaks, Pennsylvania, United States. The company describes itself as "a global provider of investment processing, investment management, and investment operations solutions". SEI provides products and services to institutions, private banks, investment advisors, investment managers, and private clients. Through its subsidiaries and partnerships in which the company has significant interests, SEI manages, advises or administers $1 trillion in hedge funds, private equity, mutual funds and pooled or separately managed assets. This includes $352 billion in assets under management and $683.3 billion in client assets under administration.

SEI has corporate headquarters in Oaks, Pennsylvania with offices in Indianapolis, Toronto, London, Dublin, The Netherlands, Hong Kong, South Africa, and Dubai.

History

SEI was founded as Simulated Environments Inc in 1968 by its current Executive Chairman and former CEO, Alfred P. West, Jr. (also known as Al West).  In the 1970s SEI developed an automated trust and investment accounting system for bank trust departments. In the 1990s SEI launched a wealth management operating platform for independent, fee-based investment advisors.

In 1994, SEI was an early investor of LSV Asset Management and currently still holds a significant stake in the firm.

In 2012 SEI was sued by investors in connection with the financial crimes committed by Allen Stanford. Stanford had sold investors bogus Certificates of Deposit (CDs) and the investors alleged that SEI, as well as other companies, had promoted and misrepresented the CDs as safe investments without performing appropriate due diligence. SEI responded that it merely provided a Stanford affiliate with back office services. As of September 2015 the case was still ongoing.

References

External links
 

Companies based in Montgomery County, Pennsylvania
Financial services companies of the United States
Financial services companies established in 1968
1968 establishments in Pennsylvania